Four ships of the Peruvian Navy have been named BAP Coronel Bolognesi after Peruvian Army hero Francisco Bolognesi:

 , commissioned in 1907, was an 
 , commissioned in 1959, was a 
 , commissioned in 1982, was a 
 , commissioned in 2006, is a 

Peruvian Navy ship names